403d Army Field Support Brigade (AFSB), headquartered at Camp Henry, Daegu, Republic of Korea, delivers U.S. Army Materiel Enterprise to supported forces throughout the Korean and Japanese Theaters of Operations.

The 403d AFSB and its subordinate units provide Tactical, Operation, and Strategic-level support to forces throughout the Region to include acquisition, logistics and technology-related sustainment support to Army, joint, and multinational forces, as well as other government agencies as directed by the Army Sustainment Command (ASC), the Army Materiel Command (AMC), and supported Senior Commanders.

History 
In April 1986 the Logistics Assistance Office-Far East (LAO-FE) was established as an Army Materiel Command  (AMC) Forward presence in the U.S. Pacific Command (PACOM); in July 1987 LAO-FE was renamed AMC-FE with the mission of providing oversight of AMC activities in the PACOM Area of Responsibility (AOR) and serving as the AMC focal point for logistics and readiness issues in support of US Army Pacific (USARPAC), US Army Japan (USARJ), and 8th US Army (EUSA).

In 1988, AMC-FE was organized under the Logistics Assistance Program Activity (LAPA) and subsequently assigned to the Logistics Support Activity (LOGSA) in 1993. After Operation Desert Storm, AMC redesigned LAPA and created Logistics Support Elements (LSE). In October 1994, AMC LSE-FE was established at Camp Market, Korea with the responsibilities of developing AMC Contingency Plans (CONPLANs), Mobilization Plans (MOBPLANs), and Operations Plans (OPLANs) in support of Army Service Component Commanders (ASCC) for contingency operations within PACOM; however, during this time, the management of the War Reserve Stocks (WRS), Depot Support Activity Far East (DSAFE) and other Logistics assets within PACOM were splintered under direct management of various AMC staff sections and organizations.

In 2000 AMC transformed again and placed AMC-LSE-FE under direct control of the Operational Support Command (OSC), headquartered in Rock Island Arsenal, Illinois which in 2002 became the US Army Field Support Command (AFSC) and today is known as Army Sustainment Command (ASC).  As a result of the transformation in 2000, AMC-LSE-FE was again renamed in 2001 to AMC Forward-Far East (AMC-FWD-FE) which saw us regaining oversight for all AMC activities in the PACOM Area of operations to include Combat Equipment Battalion-Northeast Asia (CEB-NEA) and Depot Support Activity Far East (DSAFE).

On 1 May 2005, AMC FWD-FE was re-designated as the Army Field Support Brigade-Far East and subsequently renamed the 403d Army Field Support Brigade (Provisional) on 16 October 2007. This was the result of a year-long effort to reorganize AMC-FWD-FE into a brigade structure. In conjunction with the ongoing transformation of Army forces, AFSB-FE also transformed and restructured its Logistics Assistance Offices into Logistics Support Elements (LSEs) and Brigade Logistics Support Teams (BLSTs) in order to provide modular support to USARPAC, USARJ and the Eighth Army. The AFSB-FE continued to plan and execute contingency operations in major exercises as well as deploying numerous individuals in support of Operations Enduring and Iraqi Freedom, while at the same time maintaining logistics support to the PACOM theater.

Effective 16 October 2008, the organization formally became, the 403d Army Field Support Brigade, with an approved MTOE and TDA.
On 1 October 2012, the Installation Management Command (IMCOM) Director of Logistics (DOL) resources and personnel in Korea and Japan transferred to the 403d AFSB with the mission of providing logistical support encompassing supply and services, transportation, and maintenance services to all regional and garrison forces including dependants. The Brigade continues to provide tactical to strategic-level sustainment in order to ensure Theater readiness and enable Commanders to conduct Unified-Action and the full range of military operations in Northeast Asia.

External links
Official website
Official Facebook Page
Official Flickr Page
Google Search Page

Support 403
Military units and formations established in 2007